The 1981 Junior League World Series (then known as the "Senior Little League World Series for 13-year-olds") took place from August 18–21 in Taylor, Michigan, United States. Boardman, Ohio defeated Richmond, Virginia in the championship game.

This was the inaugural JLWS.

Teams

Results

References

Junior League World Series
Junior League World Series
Junior